Kanpech is a mizik rasin band from Port-au-Prince, Haïti.

History

Kanpech has produced one album, Pale Yo, released in 1996.

Discography

Haitian musical groups